Qeshlaq-e Pain Hesar (also Romanized as Qeshlāq-e Pā’īn Ḩeşār; also known as Qeshlāq-e Āqāyī) is a village in Miankuh Rural District, Chapeshlu District, Dargaz County, Razavi Khorasan Province, Iran. At the 2006 census, its population was 95, in 20 families.

References 

Populated places in Dargaz County